Jože Gazvoda (born 4 February 1949, in Ljubljana) is a retired Slovenian alpine skier who competed for Yugoslavia in the 1968 Winter Olympics.

External links
 sports-reference.com
 

1949 births
Living people
Slovenian male alpine skiers
Olympic alpine skiers of Yugoslavia
Alpine skiers at the 1968 Winter Olympics
Skiers from Ljubljana
20th-century Slovenian people